is a Japanese singer. She is known for having performed theme songs for anime shows such as Prétear, Ai Yori Aoshi, the Ah! My Goddess TV series and the Strike Witches series, as well as for having sung for the Para Para Max CD series. She currently works under Solid Vox. Formerly she was employed by Hyper Voice Managements. Yoko Ishida and Mami Kawada are Japanese Singers with Carolwood Records and Mercury Nashville. with Strike Witches series, and A Certain Magical Index series.

Ishida entered the entertainment industry after winning a contest to become an anime song singer in 1990. She made her debut in 1993 with the song "Otome no Policy" ("Maiden's Policy"), the ending theme for the Sailor Moon R anime. At the time her name was written as 石田よう子, but she changed it to the current spelling (石田燿子) after signing up with record label Pioneer LDC (now Geneon Universal Entertainment). She has since moved back to her original label, Nippon Columbia. Apart from anime songs, she has also sung children's songs.

She married in 2008 and gave birth to her first child the following year.

Discography

Singles
 1993-03-21: "Otome no Policy" — ending theme for Sailor Moon R anime television series
 1994-08-01: "Yasashisa no Tamatebako"
 1995-06-21: "Choppiri Chef Kibun"
 1995-11-01: "Zukkoke Paradise"
 2001-10-24: "Sugar Baby Love" — opening theme for A Little Snow Fairy Sugar anime television series
 2002-04-24: "Towa no Hana" — opening theme for Ai Yori Aoshi anime television series
 2002-11-07: "Ienai Kara" — ending theme for Petite Princess Yucie anime television series
(the song is the B-side of the "Egao no Tensai" single by Puchi Puris)
 2003-02-26: "Shinjitsu no Tobira" — opening theme for Gunparade March ~aratanaru kougunka~ anime television series
 2003-10-29: "Takaramono" — opening theme for Ai yori Aoshi ~enishi~ anime television series
 2004-04-28: "Natsuiro no Kakera" — ending theme for This Ugly Yet Beautiful World anime television series
(the song is the B-side of the metamorphose single by Yoko Takahashi)
 2005-01-26: "OPEN YOUR MIND ~chiisana hane hirogete~ — theme song for Ah! My Goddess anime television series
 2006-02-08: "Aka no Seijaku" — 2nd ending theme for Shakugan no Shana anime television series
 2006-04-26: "Shiawase no Iro" — theme song for Ah! My Goddess: Everyone Has Wings anime television series (Released in North America as Ah! My Goddess: Flights of Fancy)
 2008-08-20: "STRIKE WITCHES ~Watashi ni Dekiru Koto~" — opening theme for Strike Witches anime television series
 2010-03-17: "private wing" — opening theme for Strike Witches: Soukuu no Dengekisen - Shintaichou Funtou suru DS game and Strike Witches: Anata to Dekiru Koto - A Little Peaceful Days PS2 game
 2010-08-04: "STRIKE WITCHES 2 ~Egao no Mahou~" — opening theme for Strike Witches 2 anime television series
 2014-09-20: "Connect Link" - opening theme for the first episode of the Strike Witches: Operation Victory Arrow OVA series, St. Trond's Thunder
 2014-11-26: "COLORFUL BOX" - opening theme for Shirobako anime television series
 2016-10-05: "BRAVE WITCHES ~Ashita no Tsubatsa~" - opening theme for Brave Witches anime television series

Albums
 2003-02-26: sweets 2004-08-25: Hyper Yocomix 2005-03-09: all of me 2006-08-25: Hyper Yocomix 2 2007-09-21: Single Collection 2008-06-25: Hyper Yocomix 3 2010-12-08: Another Sky 2015-12-02: Rainbow Wonderland''

References

External links

 Official site
 Official blog
 Official blog (old)
 
 Yoko Ishida home page at Geneon Entertainment

1973 births
People from Niigata (city)
Living people
Musicians from Niigata Prefecture
NBCUniversal Entertainment Japan artists
Anime singers
20th-century Japanese women singers
20th-century Japanese singers
21st-century Japanese women singers
21st-century Japanese singers